Claude Hubert "Tod" Nicholson (1892-1951) was a rugby league  footballer in  the New South Wales Rugby League (NSWRL) Competition.

Playing career
Nicholson, known as Tod, played for the Eastern Suburbs side in the 1913 season, the year the club won its third successive premiership. He is recognised as the 'Tricolours' 69th player. In 1914 he enlisted in the armed services and serviced with the 14th field ambulance corp at 2 AGH (Australian ground hospital) Boulogne, France.

Death
Nicholson died at the Concord Repatriation General Hospital on the 12 March 1951.

References

External links
The Encyclopedia Of Rugby League; Alan Whiticker & Glen Hudson

Australian rugby league players
Sydney Roosters players
Rugby league locks
Rugby league second-rows
1892 births
1951 deaths
Place of birth missing